The 1998 Las Vegas 400 was the inaugural running of the NASCAR Winston Cup Series race at Las Vegas Motor Speedway. Mark Martin, driver of the Valvoline Ford, won the race, and also led the most laps with 82. Dale Jarrett of the Quality Care Service/Ford Credit Ford won the pole position, but finished 40th due to an engine problem. A total of 120,000 people attended the race, with the profits from all three NASCAR races totaling $40 million for the local economy.

Race
The command to start the engines was given by boxing announcer Michael Buffer. Jimmy Howell was the Chief Starter per MRN's Allen Bestwick. As of the 2015 NASCAR Sprint Cup Series season, none of the top 16 finishers are currently racing full-time; Jeff Gordon, the lone current full-time driver, finished 17th.

This race has been self-acclaimed by Mark Martin as being his "biggest victory in the Winston Cup Series." Martin's 5 foot 5 inch stature made him shorter than the Vegas showgirls that posed with him after the race. He would collect six more career wins after this race; making him a strong contender for the championship with an all-new NASCAR team. The Ford Taurus would win more than 100 races after this event before it was retired and replaced with a new Ford model, the Fusion.

Jeff Burton had to fight back from a pit road penalty in order to finish the race with a decent position.

Race results
Source:

Results

Standings after the race

References

Las Vegas 400
Las Vegas 400
NASCAR races at Las Vegas Motor Speedway
March 1998 sports events in the United States